Derrick Evans may refer to:

 Derrick Evans (politician) (born 1985), West Virginia politician
 Derrick Evans (fitness instructor) (born 1952), Jamaican-born British fitness instructor

See also
Derek Evans (disambiguation)